Yusov is a Slavic masculine surname, its feminine counterpart is Yusova. Notable people with the surname include:

Dmytro Yusov (born 1993), Ukrainian football midfielder
Vadim Yusov (1929–2013), Russian cinematographer and professor

Russian-language surnames